Trignac is a commune in the Loire-Atlantique department in western France. It was created in 1913 from part of the commune of Montoir-de-Bretagne.

Population

See also
Communes of the Loire-Atlantique department
Parc naturel régional de Brière

References

Communes of Loire-Atlantique